Remo (Rheno) is an extinct indigenous language once spoken along the Môa River of Amazonas, Peru, one of several Panoan languages to go by that name.  It was similar to Amawaka.

References

Panoan languages
Extinct languages of South America